Alliance Air may refer to: 
 Alliance Air (India), a regional airline in India
 Alliance Air (Uganda), a defunct multinational airline
 Alliance Airlines, based in Brisbane, Queensland

See also
 Air Alliance, a Canadian airline which was operational from 1988 to 1999
 Airline alliance, a cooperative arrangement between two or more airlines